Walter T. Durham (October 7, 1924 – May 24, 2013) was an American historian. He was the Tennessee State Historian from 2002 to 2013, and the author of 24 books of local history.

Early life
Durham was born on October 7, 1924 in Gallatin, Tennessee to George Franklin Durham and Celeste McAlister. His paternal grandfather, J. T. Durham, served as a member of the Tennessee Senate. He served in the United States Army during World War II between 1943 and 1946. He subsequently attended the University of Wisconsin, and he graduated from Vanderbilt University, where he earned bachelor of arts and master's degrees.

Career
Durham worked as a businessman in Gallatin. He was the founding president of the Tennessee Heritage Alliance, later known as the Tennessee Preservation Trust. He also served as the president of the Tennessee Historical Society, and as the chairman of the Tennessee Historical Commission. In 2002, he was appointed as the Tennessee State Historian by Governor Don Sundquist.

Durham was the author of 24 books of local history. He wrote about the Antebellum era like Congressman Balie Peyton or the Rose Mont plantation; the American Civil War of 1861–1865 in Tennessee; and the post-bellum era like the forty-niners from Tennessee who took part in the California Gold Rush.

Personal life, death and legacy
Durham married Anna Armstrong Coile, and they had four children. They resided in Gallatin.

Durham died on May 24, 2013, at 88. His funeral was held at the First Methodist Church of Gallatin. He was succeeded as the Tennessee State Historian by Carroll Van West. Durham is the namesake of the Tennessee Historical Society's Walter Durham Award, given annually to scholars. The Walter T. Durham Bridge was named in his honor in 2015.

References

Selected works

External links
Walter T. Durham on C-SPAN

1924 births
2013 deaths
People from Gallatin, Tennessee
United States Army personnel of World War II
Military personnel from Tennessee
University of Wisconsin–Madison alumni
Vanderbilt University alumni
American historians
Local historians